α-Propiolactone, or 2-methyl-α-lactone, is a chemical compound of the lactone family, with a three-membered ring.  It is a stable product which can be obtained from the 2-bromo-propionate anion.  It is an intermediate in the decomposition of 2-chloropropionic acid in the gas phase.

See also
 β-Propiolactone
 Acetolactone

References

Alpha-lactones
Epoxides